Nancy A. Kirk (born August 8, 1942) is an American politician who served as a Democratic member of the Kansas House of Representatives from 1995 to 2006. She represented the 56th District and lived in Topeka, Kansas. Kirk won election to the open seat after the incumbent, Kathleen Sebelius, successfully ran for Kansas Insurance Commissioner.

Kirk was re-elected for five additional terms after her first. She declined to run for re-election in 2006. In 2011, Kirk ran for a nonpartisan seat on the Topeka School Board.; she won, and was re-elected in 2015.

References

1942 births
Living people
Democratic Party members of the Kansas House of Representatives
20th-century American politicians
21st-century American politicians
20th-century American women politicians
21st-century American women politicians
Women state legislators in Kansas
Politicians from Topeka, Kansas
School board members in Kansas